Bangka anak-anak are very small dugout canoes among the Sama-Bajau people of the Philippines. They are typically made by Sama-Bajau fathers for their children and are patterned after the larger Sama-Bajau dugout canoes (the buggoh, birau, and junkun). They can be used for transportation between the Sama-Bajau houseboats, but are more commonly used for playing. Children as young as three or four can use these boats, which allows them to learn valuable maritime skills.

See also
 Junkun
 Owong
 Vinta
 Djenging
 Garay (ship)
 Balangay

References 

Indigenous ships of the Philippines